Robert Hope Wilson (12 August 1898 – 26 December 1986) was an Australian rules footballer who played with Carlton in the Victorian Football League (VFL).

Notes

External links 

Bob Wilson's profile at Blueseum

1898 births
1986 deaths
Carlton Football Club players
Australian rules footballers from Victoria (Australia)
Australian military personnel of World War I